The 2014 ADAC Zurich 24 Hours of Nürburgring was the 42nd running of the 24 Hours of Nürburgring. It took place over June 19–22, 2014. The race set a new record for the total distance driven during a Nürburgring 24-hour race with 4,035 km (159 laps) driven by the top two cars.

The #4 Phoenix Racing team won the race on an Audi R8 LMS Ultra.

Race results
Class winners in bold.

References

External links
 2014 24 Hours of Nürburgring official results

Nürburgring 24 Hours
2014 in German motorsport
June 2014 sports events in Germany